Silent Gunpowder is a 1990 Yugoslav war film directed by Bato Čengić, starring Mustafa Nadarević, Branislav Lečić, Fabijan Šovagović, Mira Furlan, Boro Stjepanović and Josip Pejaković.

Plot 
Based on a novel by Branko Ćopić and set during World War II, the film tells the story of a Bosnian Serb village in the mountains of Bosnia and its villagers who found themselves divided along two opposing ideological lines in the face of the Axis invasion and subsequent occupation of the country, represented by the royalist Chetniks and the communist Partisans. These two opposing sides are personified in the Partisan commander nicknamed Španac (lit. "Spaniard", played by Mustafa Nadarević) and a former Royal Army officer Miloš Radekić (played by Branislav Lečić). Španac sees Radekić as the cause of villagers' resistance to the new communist ideology, and so the main plot revolves around the conflict between them.

Cast

Awards 
At the 1990 Pula Film Festival (the Yugoslavian version of the Academy Awards), the film won the Big Golden Arena for Best Film, as well as the awards for Best Actor in a Leading Role (Branislav Lečić), Best Film Score (Goran Bregović), and Best Makeup (Snježana Tomljenović).
The film was also shown at the 17th Moscow International Film Festival, where both Branislav Lečić and Mustafa Nadarević won the Silver St. George Award for their performances.

References

External links 
 

1990 films
Films scored by Goran Bregović
Films set in Bosnia and Herzegovina
Films set in Yugoslavia
Serbo-Croatian-language films
Yugoslav war drama films
Jadran Film films
1990s war drama films
1990 drama films
Films directed by Bato Čengić
War films set in Partisan Yugoslavia
Yugoslav World War II films